Qubudile Richard Dyantyi (born 25 October 1968) has represented the African National Congress (ANC) in the National Assembly since 2019. Before that, he was a Member of the Western Cape Provincial Parliament and served as the Western Cape's Member of the Executive Council (MEC) for Local Government and Housing from 2005 to 2008. In 2021, he was elected chairperson of the national parliament's Committee for the Section 194 Enquiry into Busisiwe Mkhwebane's fitness to hold office.

Early life and career 
Dyantyi was born on 25 October 1968 in Burgersdorp in present-day Eastern Cape (then part of the Cape Province). His home language is Xhosa. His mother, who was divorced from his father, was a domestic worker, and as a child he lived with his grandparents, who were farm labourers. He matriculated in 1989 from All Saints College in Bisho, a private school which he attended on a scholarship and where he was first-team rugby captain.

After matriculating, he joined his mother in Khayelitsha outside Cape Town. From 1991, he began volunteering at Black Sash's advice office in Khayelitsha, and he later joined the ANC. Ahead of South Africa's first democratic elections in 1994, he served the party as an election organiser. He spent five years as a researcher at the Foundation for Contemporary Research before joining the Tygerberg Municipality in 1999, shortly before it was amalgamated into the new City of Cape Town municipality.

Provincial legislature: 2004–2019 
After the 2004 general election, he joined the Western Cape Provincial Parliament, representing the ANC. On 26 July 2005, in a cabinet reshuffle by incumbent Premier Ebrahim Rasool, he was additionally appointed to the Provincial Cabinet of the Western Cape as Provincial Minister (MEC) for Local Government and Housing. In this position, he became known in South African municipal politics after he had led an unsuccessful effort in 2006 to replace the Unicity government of the City of Cape Town with a centralised executive mayor system, which would have stripped the current mayor of the municipality, Helen Zille, of her powers as mayor.

Viewed as a political ally of Premier Rasool, he was fired from the Executive Council on 31 July 2008, shortly after Lynne Brown succeeded Rasool as Premier. However, he remained an ordinary Member of the Provincial Parliament. He was re-elected to his final term in the provincial legislature in the 2014 general election, ranked fourth on the ANC's provincial party list.

National Assembly: 2019–present 
In the 2019 general election, Dyantyi did not seek re-election to the provincial legislature but was instead elected to the National Assembly, the lower house of the South African Parliament; he was ranked fourth on the ANC's provincial-to-national party list for the Western Cape. On 20 July 2021, he was elected unopposed to chair the assembly's Committee for the Section 194 Enquiry into the fitness to hold office of the incumbent Public Protector, Busisiwe Mkhwebane.

Personal life 
He is a single father to three sons.

References

External links 

 
 Mr Qubudile Richard Dyantyi at Parliament of South Africa
 "Richard Dyantyi is seeking a bloodless coup d'etat" at Cape Argus (2006-09-22).

1968 births
Living people
People from Burgersdorp
Xhosa people
African National Congress politicians
Members of the Western Cape Provincial Parliament
Members of the National Assembly of South Africa